The 2008 Alabama Republican presidential primary was held on February 5 (Super Tuesday) and had a total of 45 delegates at stake. The winner in each of the 7 congressional districts was awarded all of that district's delegates.

Results 

*Candidate withdrew prior to primary.

See also 

 2008 Alabama Democratic presidential primary
 2008 Republican Party presidential primaries

References 

Alabama
Republican presidential primary
2008
2008 Super Tuesday